New Morning is a Parisian music nightclub that opened in 1981, specialising in jazz and blues. Its concerts are often featured on Mezzo TV.

History
The first concert was given on 16 April 1981 by Art Blakey and the Jazz Messengers. It has also hosted George Russell, Stan Getz, Chet Baker, Robben Ford,  Pat Metheny, Charlie Haden, Dizzy Gillespie, Arturo Sandoval, Dexter Gordon,  Roy Hargrove, Kenny Clarke and French violinist Didier Lockwood.

Blues musicians who have appeared there include Taj Mahal, Music Maker, Terry Evans, Mighty Mo Rodgers and Roland Tchakounte.

Although mainly a jazz venue, it has also featured Stan Ridgway, Bob Dylan, Prince, Jean-Jacques Goldman, Michel Berger and Elliott Murphy.

The founder of the club is Eglal Farhi.

In 2010, Catherine Farhi took over from her mother at the direction of the room. She died on September 25, 2019, in Paris, at 97 years old.

References

External links
 Website (in French)

Jazz clubs in Paris
1981 establishments in France